Howard Alper,  (born October 17, 1941) is a Canadian chemist. He is a Professor of Chemistry at the University of Ottawa. He is best known for his research of catalysis in chemistry.

Career and research
Born in Montreal, Quebec, he received a Bachelor of Science from Sir George Williams University in 1963 and a Ph.D. from McGill University in 1967. In 1968, he started teaching at the State University of New York and became an associate professor in 1971. He joined the University of Ottawa in 1975 as an associate professor and was appointed a Professor in 1978, later being made a Distinguished University Professor in 2006.
He has published over 400 papers, has over forty patents, and has edited several books.

He was the vice-president (Research) of the University of Ottawa from 1997 to 2006. From 2001 to 2003, he was the President of the Royal Society of Canada.

Alper served as the Chair of Canada’s Science, Technology and Innovation Council from 2007 to 2015, and as one of the two co-chairs of the InterAcademy Panel on International Issues from 2006 to 2013.

Honours
He was named a Fellow of the Royal Society of Canada in 1984. In 1998, he was made an Officer of the Order of Canada. In 2000, he was awarded the first Gerhard Herzberg Canada Gold Medal for Science and Engineering, Canada's highest research honour in the field. In 2014, he was made a Commander of the Order of Merit of the Italian Republic. He was elevated to a Companion of the Order of Canada in 2020. In 2015, Professor Alper was awarded an honorary Ph.D. by the University of Pretoria </ref><

External links

References

1941 births
Living people
Anglophone Quebec people
20th-century Canadian chemists
Canadian university and college vice-presidents
Commanders of the Order of Merit of the Italian Republic
Fellows of the Royal Society of Canada
McGill University alumni
People from Montreal
Companions of the Order of Canada
Sir George Williams University alumni
Academic staff of the University of Ottawa
21st-century Canadian chemists